Wes Smith (born  in Medford, Massachusetts) is an American wheelchair curler.

He participated in the 2006 Winter Paralympics where American team finished on seventh place.

Teams

References

External links 

Living people
1940 births
Sportspeople from Medford, Massachusetts
American male curlers
American wheelchair curlers
Paralympic wheelchair curlers of the United States
Wheelchair curlers at the 2006 Winter Paralympics
American wheelchair curling champions